The 1912 season was the 29th season of regional competitive association football in Australia.

League competitions

Cup competitions

(Note: figures in parentheses display the club's competition record as winners/runners-up.)

See also
 Soccer in Australia

References

Seasons in Australian soccer
1912 in Australian sport
Australian soccer by year
Australian soccer